Kogon is a surname. Notable people with the surname include:

 Eugen Kogon (1903–1987), German politician, survivor of the Buchenwald concentration camp, and author of The Theory and Practice of Hell
 Julie Kogon (1918–1986), American boxer
 Maxwell Kogon (1920–1980), Canadian bomber pilot

Jewish surnames